Alain Lascoux (17 October 1944 – 20 October 2013) was a French mathematician at the University of Marne la Vallée and Nankai University. His research was primarily in algebraic combinatorics, particularly Hecke algebras and Young tableaux.

Lascoux earned his doctorate in 1977 from the University of Paris. He worked for twenty years with Marcel-Paul Schützenberger on properties of the symmetric group. They wrote many articles together and had a major impact on the development of algebraic combinatorics. They succeeded in giving a combinatorial understanding of various algebraic and geometric questions in representation theory. Thus they introduced many new objects related to both fields like Schubert polynomials and Grothendieck polynomials.  They were also the first to define the crystal graph structure on Young tableaux (though not under this name).

Lascoux was an invited speaker at the 1998 International Congress of Mathematicians in Berlin, Germany.

See also
LLT polynomial

References

External links
Website at Université de Marne-la-Vallée

1944 births
University of Paris alumni
2013 deaths
Combinatorialists
20th-century French mathematicians
21st-century French mathematicians